Lauterbach is a river of Baden-Württemberg, Germany. It flows into the Schiltach in Schramberg.

See also
List of rivers of Baden-Württemberg

Rivers of Baden-Württemberg
Rivers of the Black Forest
Rivers of Germany